The Neale Analysis of Reading Ability (NARA) is a tool to assess reading comprehension and reading accuracy. It was invented by Marie D. Neale.

References

Standardized tests
Education reform
Reading (process)